is a global supplier and operator of offshore floating platforms.

Background
The company has headquarters in Tokyo, Japan and regional offices in Angola, Australia, Brazil, Senegal, Belgium, Ghana, Ivory Coast, Indonesia, Mexico, Nigeria, Singapore, Thailand, USA and Vietnam.

MODEC holds 51% of the shares in SOFEC, Inc and 20% of the shares in NATCO Japan Co., Ltd. Mitsui Engineering & Shipbuilding Co., Ltd. holds around 18,700,000 shares which represents just over 50% of the company shares issued.

The company has operations in all major offshore regions and currently owns and operates 23 Floating Production Storage and Offloading vessels.

Company history
The company was founded in 1968. In the mid 1970s, MODEC began constructing jack-up drilling rigs.

The company's first offshore production vessel was the FPSO Kakap Natuna installed in April 1986 at the Kakap KH field in 88 meters water depth, approximately 175 miles west of Great Natuna Island offshore Indonesia.

MODEC delivered its first Tension leg platform (TLP) in 2001, which is installed on El Paso's Prince field in the Gulf of Mexico in 454 m (1,490 ft) water depth
In 2003, MODEC had an initial public offering and was listed on the second section of the Tokyo stock exchange.

In 2006, MODEC acquired SOFEC, Inc. and purchased 20% of the shares in NATCO Japan Co., Ltd

In 2007, MODEC entered into a joint development agreement with Velocys Inc. and Toyo Engineering Corporation to develop and commercialize gas to liquids technology for offshore applications.

MODEC has developed a proprietary Semi-submersible design called the Central Pontoon Semi (CP Semi) for use as a production platform, but has not yet gained any orders for this design. https://www.modec.com/fps/semi_sub/index.html

See also 
 List of oilfield service companies

References

External links

Official site 

Oilfield services companies
Engineering companies of Japan
Floating production storage and offloading vessel operators
Oil companies based in Tokyo
Manufacturing companies based in Tokyo
Companies listed on the Tokyo Stock Exchange
Mitsui
1968 establishments in Japan
Manufacturing companies established in 1968
Japanese brands